Metzneria varennei is a moth of the family Gelechiidae. It was described by Jacques Nel in 1997. It is found in France.

Taxonomy
Metzneria varennei is closely related to and possibly conspecific with Metzneria campicolella.

Etymology
The species is named in honour of Thierry Varenne.

References

Moths described in 1997
Metzneria